BN Radio is a Bosnian commercial radio station, broadcasting from Bijeljina.

BN Radio began broadcasting in 1995. and it was formatted as Variety radio station with Folk or Turbo-folk music, talk shows and news. RTV BN is the owner of the BN Radio, together with other 3 TV channels (Analog BN Televizija and Cable BN Televizija, BN Music) and BN Music record label.

Frequencies
The program is currently broadcast on the internet free of charge, and it is available via satellite and 28 frequencies:

 Bijeljina 
 Sarajevo 
 Posavina 
 Banja Luka 
 Banja Luka 
 Vlašić (Bosnian mountain) 
 Doboj 
 Tuzla 
 Zvornik 
 Goražde 
 Dobrljin 
 Bratunac 
 Olovo 
 Zvornik 
 Vlasenica 
 Višegrad 
 Šekovići 
 Romanija 
 Foča 
 Srebrenica 
 Olovo 
 Rogatica 
 Ključ, Una-Sana Canton 
 Trebinje 
 Gacko 
 Bileća 
 Stolac 
 Livno 
 Drežnica 
 Konjic

References

External links 
 
 Communications Regulatory Agency of Bosnia and Herzegovina
 BN Radio on Facebook.

See also 
List of radio stations in Bosnia and Herzegovina

Bijeljina
Radio stations established in 1995
Mass media in Bijeljina